The Macrophthalmidae, commonly referred to as sentinel crabs, are a family of crabs, comprising these subfamilies and genera:
Ilyograpsinae Števčić, 2005
Apograpsus Komai & Wada, 2008
Ilyograpsus Barnard, 1955
Macrophthalminae Dana, 1851
Australoplax Barnes, 1966
Enigmaplax Davie, 1993
Hemiplax Heller, 1865
Lutogemma Davie, 2008
Macrophthalmus Desmarest, 1823
Tasmanoplax Barnes, 1967
Venitus Barnes, 1967
Tritodynamiinae Števčić, 2005
Tritodynamia Ortmann, 1894

References

Ocypodoidea
Decapod families